The Wand of Youth Suites No. 1 and No. 2 are works for full orchestra by the English composer Edward Elgar. The titles given them by Elgar were, in full: The Wand of Youth (Music to a Child's Play) First Suite, Op. 1a (1869–1907) and The Wand of Youth (Music to a Child's Play) Second Suite, (Op. 1b).

History

As a boy Elgar composed some tunes for use in a play staged by the young members of the Elgar family. He noted the tunes down in a sketchbook and in 1907, four decades later, he arranged the music as the two Wand of Youth suites. Elgar also used material from some of the dance music he wrote when as a young man he was employed at what was then the Worcester City and County Lunatic Asylum, now Powick Hospital. He gave the suites the opus number 1 in recognition that they were his earliest surviving compositions, albeit now scored for full orchestra with the mature Elgar’s mastery of orchestration. Many years later Benjamin Britten followed Elgar’s precedent using his own juvenilia as the basis of his Simple Symphony.

The two suites were published by Novello & Co. in 1908.

First Suite

The First Suite is dedicated "To my friend C. Lee Williams". It consists of seven sections:

1. Overture
2. Serenade
3. Minuet (Old Style)
4. Sun Dance
5. Fairy Pipers
6. Slumber Scene
7. Fairies and Giants

It was first performed at the Queen's Hall, London on 14 December 1907, conducted by Henry Wood.

It is scored for 2 flutes, 2 oboes, 2 clarinets in B & A, 2 bassoons, 4 horns in F, 2 trumpets in B & C, 3 trombones, tuba, timpani (3), 2 percussionists (with bass drum & cymbals, triangle & snare drum), harp and string section. Not all these instruments are played in all sections.

Second Suite

The Second Suite is dedicated "To Hubert A. Leicester, Worcester".

It has six sections:

1. March
2. The Little Bells (Scherzino)
3. Moths and Butterflies (Dance)
4. Fountain Dance
5. The Tame Bear
6. The Wild Bears

It was first performed at Worcester (as part of the Three Choirs Festival) on 9 September 1908, conducted by the composer.

The suite contains excerpts from music Elgar composed for the Powick Asylum in 1879. The first movement "March" is the opening of the 3rd quadrille of "Die Junge Kokette", and the last movement "The Wild Bears" is from the 5th quadrille of "L'Assomoir".

It is scored for 2 flutes (2nd player with piccolo), 2 oboes, 2 clarinets in B & A, 2 bassoons, 4 horns in F, 2 trumpets in B , 3 trombones, tuba, timpani (3), 3 percussionists (with tambourine, bass drum & cymbals, side drum & triangle), harp and string section. Not all these instruments are played in all sections.

Selective discography

Though the complete suites are not frequently programmed in the concert hall, individual numbers are, and were required repertoire for small salon orchestras from c.1910 through to the 1960s. The length of these individual pieces was well-suited to 78 rpm recordings, and they were recorded under the baton of the composer and by several other conductors. In the era of the LP record a full Suite (each lasting around 20 minutes) fitted conveniently on one side of a disc. The suites have continued to be recorded on CD, often in tandem with other shorter pieces by Elgar such as the Nursery Suite.

Mono
London Symphony Orchestra/Sir Edward Elgar
London Philharmonic Orchestra/Eduard van Beinum

Stereo
London Philharmonic Orchestra/Sir Adrian Boult
Indianapolis Symphony Orchestra/Raymond Leppard
Academy of Saint Martin in the Fields/Sir Neville Marriner
English String Orchestra/William Boughton
Ulster Orchestra/Bryden Thomson
Royal Liverpool Philharmonic Orchestra/Vernon Handley
New Zealand Symphony Orchestra/James Judd
Welsh National Opera Orchestra/Sir Charles Mackerras

References

Reed, W. H., Elgar,  J M Dent & Sons Ltd, London, 1939
Notes to recordings listed above by LPO/Boult and RLPO/Handley

Notes

External links 

Suites by Edward Elgar
Orchestral suites
1907 compositions
1908 compositions